The Tour of Flanders, also known as De Ronde ("The Tour"), is an annual road cycling race held in Belgium every spring. The most important cycling race in Flanders, it is part of the UCI World Tour and organized by Flanders Classics. Its nickname is Vlaanderens Mooiste (Dutch for "Flanders' Finest"). First held in 1913, the Tour of Flanders had its 100th edition in 2016.

Today it is one of the five monuments of cycling, together with Milan–San Remo, Paris–Roubaix, Liège–Bastogne–Liège and the Giro di Lombardia. It is one of the two major Cobbled classics, anticipating Paris–Roubaix, which is on the calendar one week after the Tour of Flanders. The event had its only interruptions during World War I and has been organized without hiatus since 1919, the longest uninterrupted streak of any cycling classic.

Six men hold the record of most victories, making the Tour of Flanders unique among the major classics. Belgians Achiel Buysse, Eric Leman, Johan Museeuw and Tom Boonen, Italian Fiorenzo Magni and Swiss Fabian Cancellara each have three victories.

Since 2004, a women's race, the Tour of Flanders for Women, is organized annually on the same day as the men's but on a shorter distance.

Creation

The Ronde as a regional symbol
The Tour of Flanders was conceived in 1913 by Léon van den Haute, co-founder of the sports newspaper Sportwereld. In the era it was customary for publishers of newspapers and magazines to organise cycling races as a means of promoting circulation.

By the beginning of the 20th century, cycling was in a poor state in Belgium. Velodromes were closing and national championships on the road or track were no longer organised. The one major Belgian race, Liège–Bastogne–Liège, was in the French-speaking South. As the gloom increased, Odile Defraye became the first Belgian winner of the Tour de France in 1912. He was a 20-year-old Fleming and, although he rode for Alcyon, a French team, he symbolized a potential rise for Belgian cycling. Defraye's victory inspired August De Maeght, mayor of Halle and director of the press group Société Belge d'Imprimerie, to publish a Dutch-language sports magazine called Sportwereld.

Sportwereld'''s most prominent cycling writer was Karel Van Wijnendaele,Karel Wijnendaele.be a young sports journalist and passionate cycling fan who had tried cycle-racing himself. The first issue appeared in time for the Championship of Flanders on 12 September 1912. Van Wijnendaele became the editor of Sportwereld on 1 January 1913.

The Ronde and Flemish nationalism

Much has been written about the link between cycling in Flanders and Flemish nationalism. Van Wijnendaele wanted to create a race run entirely on Flemish soil, crossing as many cities as possible, because "all Flemish cities had to contribute to the liberation of the Flemish people".Van Wijnendaele, born into a poor Flemish family of flax workers, had worked for well-to-do French-speaking families in Brussels and Ostend and felt humiliated by the way they treated him.

The Tour of Flanders is the only classic to have been held on German-occupied territory during the Second World War and in full agreement with the German command. The Germans not only allowed and enjoyed the race but helped police the route as well. This led to accusations of collaboration in an age where many Flemish nationalists had strong ties with Nazi Germany. After the War, De Standaard and Het Algemeen Nieuws-Sportwereld were sequestered by the state and several journalists, largely non-sports reporters, were sentenced for collaboration. Van Wijnendaele was forbidden to work as a journalist for life – a ban lifted when he produced a letter of support from General Montgomery, confirming that he had hidden downed British pilots during the war and had protected them in his house.

A rival Flemish newspaper, Het Volk, started the Omloop van Vlaanderen in 1945. Het Volk, a left-wing publication, wanted to initiate a new cycling event in Flanders as a rival race to what it saw as the Ronde's closeness to the Nazis. The Ronde's organizers protested that the name was too close to their own – in Dutch there is little difference between Ronde and Omloop. The Belgian cycling federation demanded that Het Volk change the name of their event. That race became the Omloop Het Volk, nowadays the opening race of the Belgian cycling season.

History

The first races

On 25 May 1913 Karel van Wijnendaele organized the first Tour of Flanders, crossing the two western provinces of Flanders. It started at six in the morning in Ghent and finished in Mariakerke, now a suburb of Ghent. It covered , all on bad roads with just the occasional cycle path. The race finished on a wooden velodrome that circled a pond in Mariakerke, where ticket sales covered only half the prizes.

The first race in 1913 was won by 25-year-old Paul Deman, who won the sprint of a six-man group after more than 12 hours in the saddle. Deman went on to win Bordeaux–Paris in 1914, but his career almost ended with World War I. He joined Belgium's espionage underground war effort and smuggled documents into the neutral Netherlands by bike. After many trips he was arrested by the Germans, jailed in Leuven and held for execution. The Armistice of 1918 saved his life and he became a war hero.He started racing again and won Paris–Roubaix in 1920 and Paris–Tours in 1923. Schroeders, Fer (1999), Les Classiques du 20ème Siècle, De Eeclonaar, Belgium, p146

The first race consisted of 37 riders, followed by five assistance cars. In 1914 the field was 47 and the organization still struggled to find enough financial resources. A disappointed van Wijnendaele later said:

Sportwereld was so young and so small for the big Ronde that we wanted. We had bitten off more than we could chew. It was hard, seeing a band of second-class riders riding across Flanders, scraping up a handful of centimes to help cover the costs. The same happened in 1914. No van Hauwaert, no Masselis, no Defraeye, no Mosson, no Mottiat, no Van Den Berghe, all forbidden to take part by their French bike companies.

However, there were hints of the growing status of the race as a symbol of Flemish nationalism (see above). Marcel Buysse, one of Flanders' cycling icons in the early 20th century, insisted on entering the race, against the order of his French Alcyon team that forbade Belgian riders to participate. Buysse took part in the second edition in 1914 as one of the favourites and won the sprint of a group of six on the velodrome of Evergem, in the vicinity of Ghent.

1920s: Birth of a legend

The Tour of Flanders was interrupted for the duration of World War I and was resumed again without interruptions as from 1919. The interwar editions were marked by appalling road conditions and grisly landscapes in war-ridden Flanders, but the Tour of Flanders gained popularity fast.

In the 1920s Flemish track specialists dominated the race. Gérard Debaets, a specialist of six-day racing in the American circuit, won the race twice; in 1924 as one of only 17 finishers in dreadful weather conditions. Swiss Heiri Suter became the first foreign winner in 1923 and achieved the first ever cobbled races "double" win with Paris–Roubaix one week later. In 1926, a group of ten sprinted to the finish. Five of them crashed heavily and Denis Verschueren, competing in his first race as a professional, won the event.

The start and finish of the race in Ghent started to attract hordes of fans and by the end of the 1920s, the Ronde had become the pinnacle of the cycling season in Flanders.

1930s: Problems of success

Founder Karel Van Wijnendaele was keen on bad weather. He wanted the Tour of Flanders to be a symbol of Flemish culture and a metaphor of the country. As a journalist, he romanticized the race's protagonists in the image of the Flemish people of the time: hard-working, struggling men in a constant battle with the elements. His rhetoric, combined with often harsh conditions, contributed to the image of the Tour of Flanders as a character race where only the most headstrong and physically robust could win.

Rider characteristics

Since the early years, winners of the Tour of Flanders acquired the literary epithet Flandrien or Flahute – a French term eagerly used by the Flemish press. Flandriens were riders with a formidable durability who were able to ride fast all day, over vast distances and in all weathers. Their exploits helped cement bike racing as the foremost sport in Flanders.

Because of its demanding course and specific characteristics, the Tour of Flanders has favoured a certain type of cyclists in modern times, known as classics specialists or specialists of the cobbled classics. Main contenders must possess a broad range of athletic potential in order to win. The aggressive nature of the climbs favours explosive riders, but the length of the race requires the highest level of fitness and durability.

Although the race has never ended in a mass sprint, sprinters often do well, especially those who evolved into classic riders, like Tom Boonen or Alexander Kristoff. Time trial specialist Fabian Cancellara successfully focused on the cobbled classics, thereby using his ability to maintain a high pace as a strong weapon on the last hills and on the flat run-in to the finish. Cancellara finished solo on two of his three wins.

Many recent top-placed finishers of the cobbled classics share the same physical attributes. Record winners Johan Museeuw [ and ], Tom Boonen [ and ] and Fabian Cancellara [ and ], totalling nine combined victories, are all powerful riders and among the "heavier" types of cyclists. Recent Norwegian winner and classics specialist Alexander Kristoff is in the same range at 181 cm and 78 kg.

These physical features are not absolute however. Two-times winner Peter Van Petegem [ and ] and 2011 winner Nick Nuyens [ and ] were noticeably smaller riders.

Notable editions

1919: Van Lerberghe's speech
Gabe Konrad writes: "The 1919 winner, van Lerberghe, showed up on the line in full racing attire but, for some reason, without a bike. He borrowed one from the brother-in-law of another competitor and, prior to the starting gun, threatened the pack that he was going to drop them all at their own front doors on the way to victory. Van Lerberghe hadn't had, and would never have, an impressive career, and all the cyclists laughed as he pulled away immediately – never to be caught. Just prior to entering the velodrome for the finish, van Lerberghe stopped off at a pub to take in a few beers. His manager, worrying that he would miss a chance at victory, had to track him down and get him back on the bike. After he had crossed the line and done his lap of honour, van Lerberghe stood in front of the crowd and, in all seriousness, told them 'to go home; I'm half a day ahead of the field.'"Ritten van Lerberghe's victory speech was reported in dialect, presumably to reflect his manner of speech, as "Gaat nu ollemoale nar huz weijje. En komt morgen achternoene were, 'k lig nen halven dag vorut." Van Wijnendaele wrote occasionally in dialect and frequently in a distinctive style of Dutch that emphasised his peasant origins and the way the language had developed differently from in the neighbouring Netherlands.

1939: Kaers' training ride
Karel Kaers, the youngest man to win the world road championship, also won the Ronde in 1939 – without intending to. For him, it was training for Paris–Roubaix. He drove to the Kwaremont hill near Kluisbergen, parked his car, then rode  to the start in Ghent. His plan was to ride round the course with his usual training partner, stop when he got to his car, then drive home. Knowing he wasn't riding the whole distance, Kaers jumped clear of the field – again as training – and rode up the Kwaremont with a minute's lead. But his car wasn't there. He pressed on instead and won the race. His manager had driven the car away to save Kaers from temptation.

1944: Van Steenbergen's lucky day
Rik Van Steenbergen said: "When I turned pro, I couldn't ride it straight away. There were three categories of rider: road-riders A, road-riders B, and track riders. I was registered with the federation as a track rider. At first they wouldn't let me ride the national championship. But Jean van Buggenhout, the manager, got me reclassified on the Wednesday before the race. I won it and became an 'A' rider. Then I could start the year in the Tour of Flanders. I was 19 and I'll probably stay the youngest person ever to win." Van Steenbergen was in the break when several riders fell on the cinder track to the track in Ghent. Van Steenbergen rode round the fallen and won. Next year he decided not to ride. Van Wijnendaele was offended. But Van Steenbergen had realised why he'd turned pro: to make a living. "I could probably win more money elsewhere," he said. "The Tour of Flanders didn't have the attraction that it does now, especially not internationally."

1946: Van Steenbergen again
Van Steenbergen returned in 1946 and won again. He said: "That was one of my best wins ever. I could do whatever I liked, ride better than anyone. In the end I was with Briek Schotte and Enkel Thiétard. They were happy just to follow me. We made an agreement. I said that they could stay with me until we got to Kwatrecht. I wouldn't drop them provided they'd do their best to work with me. They were happy with that. They didn't have a choice. Under the bridge at Kwatrecht I just got rid of them."

1951: Magni's festival
Fiorenzo Magni, a rare Italian in Belgian classics, won so many intermediate prizes during his long solo flight that they would have bought him a house (see above). He was one of nine to escape the field at Ingelmunster. The others cracked one by one until Magni was alone by Strijpen – the point where he made his winning move the previous year. He rode the last  alone to win the Ronde for the third successive year. Magni won by almost eight minutes and the first five finishers were foreigners.

1961: Simpson vs. Defilippis
Such a gale blew in 1961 that the banner over the finish line blew down. The British rider Tom Simpson was clear with the better-known Italian champion, Nino Defilippis. Simpson, the weaker sprinter, accelerated for the line with a kilometre to go. It was too far and Defilipis came past him as he weakened. Simpson struggled to stay with him and was delighted when the Italian began freewheeling just before the finish. Defilippis said he didn't know where the finish was because the banner had blown down, but the two riders had already covered two previous laps of the finishing circuit. For the same reason, the Italian protest that the line on the road wasn't clearly marked also failed. Defilippis asked Simpson to agree to a tie, saying no Italian had won a classic since 1953. Simpson said: 

1969: Merckx' panache
Eddy Merckx dominated world racing in both classics and stage races but couldn't win the Ronde. By 1969 he had not only frustration to contend with but rising resentment of other riders unhappy that he won so many races. He attacked early and half the field never saw him again. The other half was reduced with each successive attack until he got clear alone. The chase was furious but ineffective and Merckx won by more than five and a half minutes over Felice Gimondi and more than eight minutes on the rest. The Ronde remained an unhappy race for him; it was another six years before he won again.

1985: Vanderaerden in the storm
Bad weather has often hit the Ronde. In 1985, a storm broke in the second half of the race. The weather was so bad that only 24 made it to the finish. The race historian, Rik Vanwalleghem, said: "It was a legendary Ronde, one which wrote Sport with a capital S. It was as cold as Siberia all day and the rain fell in torrents (regende het pijpenstelen) [...] In this apocalyptic background Eric Vanderaerden got back to the front after looking beaten to ride  at the head of the race alone. Impressive."

1987: Skibby on the Koppenberg
The danger of the Ronde's narrow and badly surfaced hills came close to tragedy when Danish rider Jesper Skibby was hit from behind by an official's car and fell onto a roadside bank, still strapped into his pedals. The official's car then tried to pass him and ran over Skibby's back wheel, narrowly missing his leg.Vanwalleghem, Rik (1998), Het Wonder van Vlaanderen, Pinguin, Belgium, p227 The race official continued to the finish, where he was met by angry spectators throwing mud, cups and stones at his car. The incident overshadowed the victory of Claude Criquielion, the first French-speaking Belgian winner of the Tour of Flanders.

Opinions
"Only those who are in top condition can say that the Ronde is not hard. For everyone else, it's the Way of the Cross." – Andrea Tafi"I told the organisers it wasn't a race but a war game. It's hard to explain what the Koppenberg means to a racing cyclist. Instead of being a race, it's a lottery. Only the first five or six riders have any chance: the rest fall off or scramble up as best they can. What on earth have we done to send us to hell now?" – Bernard Hinault
"As a Belgian, winning Flanders for the first time is far more important than wearing the maillot jaune [yellow jersey] in the Tour" – Johan Museeuw
"Looking back, you get a bit nostalgic, but from a competitive point of view, Flanders was one of the most horrible races to ride but one of the greatest races to win." – Sean Kelly
"Many great names of Flemish cycling live on the route of the race. This closeness doesn't exist in any other country. That's what gives our identity." – Nico Mattan"These days, you see all the riders, their life is well known. Before, you saw only the last two hours on television.  Now, the direct coverage starts before the race has started and the legend that surrounded riders, created in people's imagination, no longer exists. When everything is too realistic, you lose the legend." – Marc Sergeant
"The Tour of Flanders is unlike any other bike race in the world. It is, without question, the hardest one-day bike race ever created. What seems like a million corners, combined with twenty to thirty steep pitches and narrow roads, none of which go the same direction for more than a mile, all mix together to make it war on a bike. There isn’t a race in North America that compares. Flanders may as well be a different sport." – George Hincapie

Winners

Multiple winners

Wins per country

Winners of the Cobbled Classics Double
On 12 occasions the Tour of Flanders and Paris–Roubaix had the same winner in the same year. Tom Boonen and Fabian Cancellara are the only riders who have achieved this double twice.

Records and statistics
 The longest Tour of Flanders was its first running in 1913: 
 The shortest Tour of Flanders was the war-time edition of 1941: 
 The fastest edition was in 2001, won by Italian Gianluca Bortolami:  average.
 The slowest edition was in 1923, won by Swiss Heiri Suter:  average.
 The largest margin between the winner and runner-up was in 1919, when Henri Van Lerberghe held a 14-minute lead over the first chasing group.
 The largest post-war margin between the winner and runner-up was in 1969, when Eddy Merckx won by a margin of 5 minutes 36 seconds over second-place finisher Felice Gimondi. In 1951 Fiorenzo Magni won by 5 minutes 35 seconds Bernard Gauthier.
 The youngest winner was Rik Van Steenbergen in 1944 at 19 years and 206 days.
 The oldest winner was Andrei Tchmil in 2000 at 37 years and 71 days.
 The Tour of Flanders attracts 600.000-800.000 spectators along the road annually, on a total Flemish population of 6.5 million.
 The record for most participations is held by Belgian Briek Schotte, who participated 20 consecutive times from 1940 to 1959 and finished 16 times with 8 podium places and 2 victories in 1942 and 1948.
American George Hincapie holds the record of most finishes, with 17 finishes in 17 races.
 Six men share the record of victories, with three each: Achiel Buysse won in 1940, 1941 and 1943; Italian Fiorenzo Magni won in 1949, 1950, 1951; Eric Leman won in 1970, 1972 and 1973; Johan Museeuw won the race in 1993, 1995 and 1998; Tom Boonen won in 2005, 2006 and 2012,Tour of Flanders – Flanders by numbers, 9 May 2007, uk.eurosport.yahoo.com and Swiss Fabian Cancellara, who won in 2010, 2013 and 2014.
 The nation with the most victories is Belgium (69).
 Seven riders have won two years in a row: Romain Gijssels, Achiel Buysse, Fiorenzo Magni, Eric Leman, Tom Boonen, Stijn Devolder and Fabian Cancellara.
 Only one rider (Fiorenzo Magni) won three consecutive victories.
 Two riders achieved a record eight podium finishes: Briek Schotte (twice first, twice second, four times third) and Johan Museeuw (three times first, three times second, twice third).
 Sean Kelly and Leif Hoste have the most second places without ever winning the Tour of Flanders, each finishing second on three occasions.
 Five riders won the race in the rainbow jersey as world champions: Louison Bobet in 1955, Rik Van Looy in 1962, Eddy Merckx in 1975, Tom Boonen in 2006 and Peter Sagan in 2016.

Tour of Flanders for Women

Since 2004 there is a women's Tour of Flanders, held every spring on the same day as the men's race. It is part of the UCI Women's World Tour and is considered one of the most prestigious events in women cycling.

From 2004 to 2011 the race ran over a  course which started in Oudenaarde and finished in Meerbeke, with the last  identical to the men's race. Since 2012 the race starts and finishes in Oudenaarde. In 2018 the race features 12 climbs, including the Muur van Geraardsbergen, Oude Kwaremont, Paterberg and three long flat cobbled sectors. The final , including Kruisberg, Oude Kwaremont and Paterberg, are identical to the men's finale.

Dutch rider Mirjam Melchers-Van Poppel and Germany's Judith Arndt currently hold the record with two wins.

Experience center

The Centrum Ronde van Vlaanderen (Tour of Flanders Center) is an interactive cycling-themed experience center and museum in Oudenaarde devoted to the Tour of Flanders. It opened in 2003 with an extensive array of audiovisual material from old television and radio broadcasts. Visitors are able to experience a ride on a cobbled road or experience the Kwaremont climb, in a virtual contest with stars like Peter Van Petegem.

The center's founder and director is former sports journalist and writer Rik Van Walleghem; the museum curator is 1970s cycling icon Freddy Maertens, who provides guided tours.

The center is located on Oudenaarde's city square, close to the finish of the Tour of Flanders, relocated to Oudenaarde in 2012. There is also a brasserie and a museum shop.

Cyclosportive
Since 1999, there is a Tour of Flanders Cyclosportive for non-professionals, called We Ride Flanders'', organized on the day before the professional event. Because of its growing success, the number of participants has been restricted to 16,000 in order to secure riders' safety on the roads. Tickets are usually sold out months before the race. 60% of participants are non-Belgians.

See also
Tour of Flanders for Women
Classic cycle races

Notes

External links
 Recaps of all Tours of Flanders since 1959 (Flemish television)

References

External links

 
 

 
UCI ProTour races
Classic cycle races
Cycle races in Belgium
Recurring sporting events established in 1913
1913 establishments in Belgium
UCI Road World Cup races
UCI World Tour races
Annual sporting events in Belgium
Sport in Flanders
Sport in East Flanders
Sport in West Flanders
Spring (season) events in Belgium
Challenge Desgrange-Colombo races
Super Prestige Pernod races